Ultima Thule primarily refers to:

 Thule, a Latin (and earlier Greek) name for an island north of Britain
 486958 Arrokoth, a Kuiper belt object previously nicknamed “Ultima Thule” before its official naming, visited on January 1, 2019 by NASA's New Horizons spacecraft

Ultima Thule may also refer to:

Music 
 Ultima Thule, a song by Japanese Band Otsukisama Koukyoukyoku
 Ultima Thule (Swedish band)
 Ultima Thule (Estonian band)
 Ultima Thule Ambient Music, an Australian radio show
 Ultima Thule, an album by Polish band Armia
 Ultima Thulée, an album by French band Blut Aus Nord
 Ultima Thule, an album by British band Ostara 
 Ultima Thule, an album by Finnish band UMO Jazz Orchestra
 "Ultima Thule", a single by German band Tangerine Dream, included in reissues of their Alpha Centauri album
 Starfire Burning Upon the Ice-Veiled Throne of Ultima Thule, an album by Bal-Sagoth
 L'ultima Thule, an album by Italian singer Francesco Guccini
 Ultima Thule Rap song by Russian rapper Oxxxymiron feat Luperkal

Literature 
 Ultima Thule, a poetry collection by Henry Wadsworth Longfellow
 Ultima Thule, a volume of the novel The Fortunes of Richard Mahony by Henry Handel Richardson
 "Ultima Thule", a science-fiction short story by Mack Reynolds
 "Ultima Thule", a short story by Vladimir Nabokov
 "Ultima Thule", a short story by Stefan Grabiński
 "Ultima Thule", a nickname for Thulium Delphiki a character in the book The Last Shadow by Orson Scott Card
 Ultima Thule, brotherhood of white supremacists in The Ink Black Heart novel by Robert Galbraith (aka J K Rowling)

Other uses 
 Ultima Thule, a 2002 film by Janie Geiser
 Ultima Thule Creek (UT Creek) a small natural watercourse near the town of Alexandra, Victoria, Australia
 Ultima Thule Peak, a mountain in Alaska
 Ultima Thule, a set of glassware designed by Tapio Wirkkala for Iittala
 Ultima Thule, a frozen planet in the episode "Death's Other Dominion" of Space: 1999
 Ultima Thule, a key location in Final Fantasy XIV: Endwalker
 Ultima Thule is a planet mentioned in Star Trek Deep Space 9 episode 17 of the first season.

See also 

 
 Thule (disambiguation)
 Ultima (disambiguation)